The Mothers of the Plaza 25 de Mayo, also known simply as Las Madres de Rosario or Madres Rosario, is an Argentine human rights group based in Rosario, Santa Fe Province, Argentina. The organization was created by a group of women who sought answers to the forced disappearance of their children during the Dirty War and military dictatorship from 1976 to 1983. The Mothers of the Plaza 25 de Mayo were initially founded as a Rosario-based branch of the larger, national Mothers of the Plaza de Mayo, but later developed their own association to focus on forced disappearances in Santa Fe Province.

Mothers of the Plaza 25 de Mayo takes its name from the Plaza 25 de Mayo in Rosario, where the mothers conduct their weekly march every Thursday to call for justice for their children.

References

Human rights organisations based in Argentina
Women's organisations based in Argentina
Political movements in Argentina
Dirty War
1982 establishments in Argentina
Rosario, Santa Fe